The Professor Thorolf Rafto Memorial Prize (Raftoprisen) is a human rights award established in the memory of the Norwegian human rights activist, Thorolf Rafto.

Organization
The prize is awarded annually by the Rafto Foundation for Human Rights (Raftostiftelsen) which was founded in the humanistic tradition of the Helsinki Accords in order to promote the fundamental human rights of intellectual and political freedom. Today, the foundation is based at the Human Rights House in Bergen, Norway. The major work of the foundation, including the organization of the award ceremony is done by a small team of professional staff and volunteers. The award ceremony takes place at Den Nationale Scene in Bergen annually in November.

The initial idea of the Rafto Prize was to provide a basic informative platform for the laureates that would help to receive further attention from the international media and support from political and non-political organisations. By awarding the Rafto Prize, the Rafto Foundation for Human Rights seeks to bring attention to independent voices that due to oppressive and corruptive regimes are not always heard. For example, four Rafto Laureates have subsequently received further international assistance and were awarded the Nobel Peace Prize. Aung San Suu Kyi, José Ramos-Horta, Kim Dae-jung and Shirin Ebadi were awarded the Rafto Prize prior to the Nobel Peace Prize.

History
Thorolf Rafto was a professor of Economic History at the Norwegian School of Economics and Business Administration (NHH). He was also well known for his political activism in Eastern Europe, especially in Hungary, Czechoslovakia and Poland.  During a visit to Prague in 1979 to hold a lecture for students excluded from universities for political reasons. Rafto was arrested and beaten by the communist security police which may have resulted in injuries which weakened his health. On 4 November 1986 Thorolf Rafto died.

His friends and colleagues agreed to establish a foundation that would continue Rafto's work such as promotion of freedom of speech and political expression in Eastern Europe.  It was also decided to introduce a prize for human right activists. The fall of the Iron Curtain and consequential democratization of Eastern European states led to a reconsideration the mission of the foundation. Meanwhile it had opened new possibilities to work with other geographical regions in a promotion of human rights. Already in 1990, the Rafto Prize was awarded to a Burmese democratic leader, Aung San Suu Kyi who, in the following year 1991, received the Nobel Peace Prize for her non-violent struggle for democracy and human rights.  For the first years, the foundation was based at the Norwegian School of Economics and Business Administration. From 1997, the Rafto Foundation was relocated to the Human Rights House of Bergen, Norway.

Ceremony
The Rafto Prize is awarded annually on the first Sunday in November and since 1990, the official ceremony takes place at the National Theatre of Bergen. Among the invited guests are representatives from Bergen municipality and the Norwegian government, academics, supporters and partners of the Rafto Foundation and family members of the Rafto family.

Criteria and nomination process
The annual deadline for nominations is 1 April. Voluntary organisations, institutions and individuals worldwide, with knowledge or interest in human rights are allowed to nominate candidates for the Rafto Prize. Former recipients of the prize can also nominate candidates, although candidates who are nominated by themselves or by their staff or by honorary officers will not be taken into consideration. After the deadline, all applications are carefully considered by the prize committee and the final decision is usually released at the press conference at Rafto House in September.

List of Laureates

References

Other sources
Per Egil Hegge (2016) Fear Shall Not Triumph: The Rafto Prize - 30th Anniversary   (Bergen: Fagbokforlaget)  
Atle M. Skjærstad (2016) Uværet som aldri stilnet (Bergen: Vigmostad & Bjørke AS)

External links 
Rafto Laureates

Peace awards
Norwegian awards
Human rights awards
Awards established in 1987
Organisations based in Bergen
Human rights in Norway